Carl August Herold Jansson (13 November 1899 – 23 April 1965) was a Danish gymnast and diver who competed in the 1920 Summer Olympics and in the 1924 Summer Olympics. He was born in Copenhagen and died in Frederiksberg.

Jansson was part of the Danish team, which won the gold medal in the gymnastics men's team, free system event in 1920. He also competed in the plain high diving competition and finished sixth. Four years later he was eliminated in the first round of the 1924 plain high diving event.

References

External links

1899 births
1965 deaths
Danish male artistic gymnasts
Danish male divers
Olympic gymnasts of Denmark
Olympic divers of Denmark
Gymnasts at the 1920 Summer Olympics
Divers at the 1920 Summer Olympics
Divers at the 1924 Summer Olympics
Olympic gold medalists for Denmark
Olympic medalists in gymnastics
Medalists at the 1920 Summer Olympics
Sportspeople from Copenhagen